Cassolnovo is a comune (municipality) in the Province of Pavia in the Italian region Lombardy, located about 30 km southwest of Milan and about 35 km northwest of Pavia. As of 31 December 2004, it had a population of 6,203 and an area of 32.0 km².

Cassolnovo borders the following municipalities: Abbiategrasso, Cerano, Gravellona Lomellina, Sozzago, Terdobbiate, Tornaco, Vigevano.

People 
Gaspare Campari (1828–1882) creator of Campari

Demographic evolution

References

Cities and towns in Lombardy